Veliko Polje (locally also ;) is a small settlement northwest of Dolenja Vas in the traditional Inner Carniola region of Slovenia. It is now generally regarded as part of the Slovenian Littoral. It lies within the Municipality of Sežana.

References

External links

Veliko Polje on Geopedia

Populated places in the Municipality of Sežana